Poul Glargaard, born Rasmussen (11 April 1942 – 17 October 2011) was a Danish actor. He joined the Aarhus Theater in 1966 and the Aalborg Theater later, entering film in 1968. He has also appeared in numerous TV programmes in Denmark. He was also a successful comedian and entertainer, and dubber. Many audio-dramas (for instance Star Wars and several children's horror stories) voiced by him and originally released in the 1980s and 1990s remain popular to this day. Some of his movies have reached cult status, but they only became popular after his death.

Filmography
Det er så synd for farmand - 1968
Magic in Town - 1968
Det kære legetøj - 1968
The Veterinarian's Adopted Children - 1968
Trekanter - 1969
Ta' lidt solskin - 1969
Ballad of Carl-Henning - 1969
Rend mig i revolutionen - 1970
The Olsen Gang's Big Score - 1972
The Olsen Gang Goes Crazy - 1973
Strømer - 1976
I skyttens tegn - 1978
 Jul i Gammelby - 1979
In the Middle of the Night - 1984
Hvordan vi slipper af med de andre - 2007

References

External links

1942 births
2011 deaths
Danish male film actors
20th-century Danish male actors
Danish male television actors
Danish male stage actors
People from Randers
2011 suicides